Aleksei Vladimirovich Tikhonkikh (born 3 April 1977) is a former Russian professional football player. He works as the director for FC Chita.

Club career
He played 3 seasons in the Russian Football National League for FC Lokomotiv Chita and FC Metallurg-Kuzbass Novokuznetsk.

References

External links
 

1977 births
Living people
Russian footballers
Association football forwards
FC Sibir Novosibirsk players
FC Zvezda Irkutsk players
FC Novokuznetsk players
FC Chita players